Muhamad Zawawi Azman (born 3 August 1994) is a Malaysian professional racing cyclist, who currently rides for UCI Continental team .

Major results

2015
 1st  Road race, National Under-23 Road Championships
2016
 1st Stage 4 Jelajah Malaysia
 3rd Time trial, National Under-23 Road Championships
2017
 1st  Overall Tour de Selangor
1st Stage 1
 10th Overall Tour de Molvccas
2018
 2nd Overall Tour de Lombok
1st  Mountains classification
1st Stage 2
2019
 1st Stage 9 Tour de Singkarak

References

External links

Living people
1994 births
Malaysian male cyclists
20th-century Malaysian people
21st-century Malaysian people